The Tasang Dam, also known as the Mong Ton Dam, is a planned multi-purpose dam on the Salween River in the Shan State, Myanmar. The Tasang Dam will be the first dam on the Salween River and will be the largest hydroelectric dam in Myanmar and the tallest dam in Southeast Asia if completed. The Tasang will cost more than US$6 billion and is planned for completion in 2022. The groundbreaking ceremony was in March 2007, but  construction has been stalled, and there has been little activity at the dam site as of 2008.

Substantial domestic and international controversy surrounds the Tasang Dam project.  The Tasang dam is one of five dams the Myanmar Government plans to build on the Salween River.

Background
Since the late 1990s, the Burmese Government proposed to build the Tasang dam but was unable to implement the construction plan until this decade because of civil unrest. Nippon Koei,  a Japanese company conducted studies for the dam in 1981 and subsequent studies were done in 2002.  Thailand's MDX Group agreed in 2002 to develop the project.  Thailand is the main investor in the dam project and the trade of the TaSang's electricity is expected to help relations between Thailand and Burma. 85% of the hydro-electricity produced is expected to be transmitted to Thailand.

Design
Tasang's  reservoir will bisect a large portion of Shan State, preluding serious social and environmental problems.

Construction
Construction on the dam is being led by the Thai MDX Group along with the China Gezhouba Group Co., Sinohydro Corporation, China Southern Power Grid Company, China Three Gorges Project Corporation and the British Malcolm Dunstan & Associates.  The groundbreaking ceremony for the dam was in March 2007, but since the ceremony, actual construction of the dam has been stalled, and there has been little activity at the dam-site.

Social Impact
Since 1996, as many as 300,000 villagers, mostly Shan people have been displaced to make room for the Tasang Dam's reservoir.  Thousands more relocations are expected as construction progresses.  The dam's reservoir will dissect Shan State in half –almost to the Chinese border – and will negatively impact the local communities and ecosystems.  Myanmar's Junta is responsible for the relocations and there have reports of serious human rights violations including executions.

References

Dams in Myanmar
Dam controversies
Proposed hydroelectric power stations
Salween River
Proposed renewable energy power stations in Myanmar